Gregory Webster is a British musician. In 1985 he founded the Razorcuts with Tim Vass. He then played in The Carousel with Elizabeth Price (ex-Talulah Gosh) from 1989 to 1994. Soon after he was the protagonist in Saturn V. In 1997 he founded Sportique with Mark Flunder and Rob Pursey.

References 

Living people
Year of birth missing (living people)